also known simply as either Bad Dudes (on the American NES port) or  (in Japan and Europe), is a side-scrolling cooperative beat 'em up game developed and released by Data East for arcades in 1988. It was also ported to many computer and game console home systems.

In Bad Dudes, the players are set in the role of the titular duo tasked with rescuing "President Ronnie" from ninja kidnappers. The game was met with commercial success, becoming one of America's top five highest-grossing arcade games of 1988. The arcade version received generally positive reviews from critics, while the home conversions received a generally positive to mixed critical reception. It has since become widely known for its general premise and introductory cut scene.

Plot
The game starts in Washington, D.C., where President Ronnie (based on the U.S. President Ronald Reagan) has been abducted by the evil Dragon Ninja. The game's intro begins with the following introduction: "Rampant ninja related crimes these days ... Whitehouse is not the exception". A Secret Service agent speaks to the titular "Bad Dudes", two street-smart brawlers named Blade and Striker: "President Ronnie has been kidnapped by the ninjas. Are you a bad enough dude to rescue Ronnie?" The Bad Dudes pursue the Dragon Ninja through the New York City streets, onto a moving big rig truck, through a large storm sewer, through a forest, onto a freight train on an old Southern Pacific line (where the titular character of another Data East arcade game, Chelnov, can be seen being transported in a frozen container in the arcade version), through a cave, and into an underground factory in order to save President Ronnie.

The Japanese and English language versions' endings of the game differ. In the English version, after the Bad Dudes defeat the Dragon Ninja, they celebrate by eating hamburgers with President Ronnie. At the very end, President Ronnie is seen holding a burger while standing between the Bad Dudes. Behind them are many security guards, with the White House in the background. In the Japanese version, President Ronnie gives the Bad Dudes a statue of them, as a reward. The Bad Dudes are seen leaning against a fence on a sidewalk next to their statue. Unlike the ending of the international version, the Japanese version's ending shows a list of nearly every enemy in the game with their names (except the unnamed green ninja boss that multiplies himself, named Kamui in Japanese magazine coverage at the time), while some faces appear next to the names of the game's staff. The background music played in both versions' endings is also completely different.

Gameplay

The gameplay of Bad Dudes allows up to two players to play at once.

Player one controls the character Blade, who wears white pants, and player two controls the character Striker, who wears green pants. Players start with the ability to do basic punches, kicks, and jumps. Some moves are special like spinning kicks and the ability to charge themselves up with "inner energy" by holding the punch button to throw a powerful long-range attack that hits all opponents in front of the player. Players will also come across several power-ups; some are weapons like knives and nunchakus, some recharge a player's health, and yet others add a few seconds to the remaining time.

The various types of enemies encountered in the game have their own means of attack. The basic blue-colored ninjas directly charge the player, while some leap with their swords, or throw shuriken and makibishi; there are also acrobatic kunoichi (female ninjas), attack dogs, and people who are on fire. The enemies may be beaten down or avoided. Most enemies can be beaten with only a single hit of any kind, and multiple enemies can be defeated with one hit if they are standing close together.

At the end of each level, one of the super warrior bosses will appear, who needs to be defeated to progress to the next level. The first of them, at the climax of the City stage, is Karnov, who makes a cameo appearance from the Data East game of the same name. Second, at the climax of the Truck stage, is a talon-wielding ninja, Iron Arm. Third, at the climax of the Sewer stage, is Kamui, another ninja master, who creates illusions by copying himself. Fourth, at the climax of the Forest stage, is Animal, a behemoth-of-a-man who is also not a ninja. Fifth, at the climax of the Train stage, is Akaikage, a kusarigama-wielding warrior. Last, at the climax of the Cave stage, is Devil Pole, a bōjutsu-master. Finally, the leader of the Dragon Ninja gang, coincidentally also called Dragon Ninja, appears during the climax in his headquarters, where there is a final showdown on a helicopter. The background music during the fight with him is similar to the main theme in Karnov.

Each boss has his own special attack: Karnov, for example, can breathe fire at the player. At the successful completion of each level and after defeating the boss, the dude(s) will strike a "bad" pose and proclaim, "I'm bad!". The shout, and the game's American wordmark logo are both similar to the Michael Jackson song "Bad", released the previous year. In the Japanese version of the game, this quote was originally a battle cry.

History
The game was ported to several home systems, including the Apple II, Atari ST, Amiga, Amstrad CPC, Commodore 64, ZX Spectrum, MSX and PC DOS in 1988. Quicksilver Software developed the Apple II and PC ports with the rest produced by UK-based Ocean Software. Ocean also published the game in Europe on their Imagine label as Bad Dudes Vs. DragonNinja. These versions were titled Dragon Ninja in-game, and the "Bad Dudes Vs." was heavily de-emphasised in the cover art, resulting in the game commonly being known by the latter title (including among the European gaming press of the time).

On July 14, 1989, a NES/Famicom port was developed by Data East and published in Japan by Namco as DragonNinja. In North America, the same version was released the same year by Data East USA simply as Bad Dudes, featuring an illustration by Marc Ericksen. 

After Data East became defunct due to their bankruptcy in 2003, G-Mode bought the intellectual rights to the arcade game, as well as most other Data East games, and licensed them globally. The arcade version is also featured, along with several other Data East arcade games, on the Wii title Data East Arcade Classics, produced by Majesco Entertainment with permission from G-Mode. In 2018, the Nintendo Switch version was released in the Johnny Turbo's Arcade series, featuring a new, live-action intro. It uses a fanart mockup screenshot but actually features the original arcade graphics.

The 8-bit versions, including the PC version (which was technically 16-bit), lacked the two-player cooperative mode in any form, instead having an alternating two-player mode. The title screen of the Japanese version became different, while the English version's was unchanged. The Secret Service agent's quote at the intro screen to the NES version was phrased slightly differently as "The President has been kidnapped by ninjas. Are you a bad enough dude to rescue the President?", while the Famicom counterpart's quote was slightly similar to the international arcade and NES quotes. The reference to President Ronnie (an overt reference to former president of the United States Ronald Reagan) was removed because Nintendo of America did not allow political content in games. In that version, the President bears a resemblance to George H. W. Bush, who was the president of the United States when the NES version was released. The endings of the Japanese and English language versions of the NES port are based on the international arcade version; however, the Japanese version does not show the credits but only shows "The End" at the White House scene and lasts a shorter time than the English version. The 8-bit home computer versions lacked the intro from either the arcade or the NES versions. The "I'm bad!" speech was only present in the NES version but it does not sound identical to its arcade counterpart.

Reception

Arcade
The game was commercially successful in arcades. In Japan, Game Machine listed DragonNinja on their May 15, 1988, issue as being the seventh most-successful table arcade unit of the month. In North America, it was a high-earning arcade game, becoming one of the top five highest-grossing arcade games of 1988. On the UK Coinslot charts, during Summer 1988, Bad Dudes was number two on the monthly arcade video game chart. On Hong Kong's annual Bondeal chart, it was the seventh highest-grossing arcade game of 1988.

The arcade game received generally positive reviews from critics upon release. Sinclair User magazine, in its January 1989 issue, gave it the award for best Beat 'Em Up of 1988.

Home
In the ZX Spectrum sales charts, it was number two, behind Robocop.

The home conversions received a generally positive to mixed critical reception. Computer Gaming World noted the IBM port was satisfactory and compared it favorably to similar ports of Double Dragon and Renegade, but the Apple II port suffered greatly.

President Ronnie, as he appears in the arcade version of the game, was ranked second in EGM'''s list of the top ten video game politicians in 2008. In 2010, UGO wrote: "No ninja game retrospective could possibly be complete without some mention of ... Bad Dudes". In 2013, Complex had it top their list of "the video games where you kick ass in the name of America" as the most American game of them all.

Legacy
The game was followed by a 1991 spiritual successor Two Crude (known in Japan as Crude Buster). A sequel attempt, supposed to take place 23 years after the first game, was unsuccessfully attempted to be financed via Kickstarter by Pinstripe Games in 2012.

The arcade version of the game appears in the 1989 film Parenthood, in which the son of Steve Martin's character wonders why the game is so difficult. Martin, grasping for an answer, says, "Well, they're bad dudes. That's why they call the game Bad Dudes". The Bad Dudes logo can be seen at the end of Stage 4 in Sly Spy, another Data East arcade game. In the 1990 film RoboCop 2, Officer Duffy gets pushed by RoboCop into a Bad Dudes Vs. DragonNinja arcade cabinet, but with Sly Spy built into it.

The game's introduction, challenging the player to be a "bad enough dude to rescue the President", became a popular Internet meme and is often lampooned on various websites. The 2008 video game Sam & Max Beyond Time and Space spoofs on the Bad Dudes intro in the episode "Chariots of the Dogs". Alternative rock band Lostprophets' first release, The Fake Sound of Progress, includes a track titled "Shinobi vs. Dragon Ninja" in a reference to the video games Shinobi and Bad Dudes vs. DragonNinja. The webcomic The Adventures of Dr. McNinja'' often references the Bad Dudes, among many other 1980s pop culture touchstones.

An updated version of the game has been announced for release exclusively for the Intellivision Amico.

Notes

References

External links
 
 
 

1988 video games
Amiga games
Amstrad CPC games
Apple II games
Arcade video games
Atari ST games
Commodore 64 games
Cooperative video games
Data East arcade games
Data East video games
DOS games
Fictional duos
Video game memes
Multiplayer and single-player video games
Nintendo Entertainment System games
Nintendo Switch games
Ocean Software games
Side-scrolling beat 'em ups
Video games about ninja
Video games developed in Japan
Video games scored by Jean Baudlot
Video games set in New York City
Video games set in Washington, D.C.
Zeebo games
ZX Spectrum games
Quicksilver Software games